(In memory), Op. 59, is a funeral march for orchestra by Jean Sibelius. It was written in memory of Eugen Schauman. Sibelius composed a first version in 1909 and completed a final version in 1910. He conducted the first performance in Oslo on 8 October 1910. The piece was performed at his own funeral.

History 

The work was written to commemorate Eugen Schauman who had in 1904 shot Governor-General Nikolay Bobrikov and then killed himself. Sibelius mentioned on New Year's Day of 1905 "that he intended to write a requiem in memory of Eugen Schauman and that he had already started to work on it. – I just hope it will be worthy of its subject matter! After all, it will be the only monument that we can raise for him!"

Only in 1909, after his throat surgery which made him think of death, he returned to the idea. Erik Tawaststjerna assumes that he wrote it also for himself. He composed a first version in 1909, completed on 14 December 1909. His models were the funeral marches of Beethoven's Symphony No. 3 "Eroica" and Wagner's Götterdämmerung. The work in sonata form is introduced by the violins and violas, with a main theme developing "like the approach of a distant cortege". He sent the work to the publisher Breitkopf.

Reading the proofs, Sibelius was not satisfied, especially with the instrumentation. He revised the piece, completing the work in March 1910. Sibelius first performed it on 8 October 1910, played by the Musikforeningen, in concerts in Kristiania, now Oslo, Norway.

 was played at the funeral of Sibelius in 1957.

Literature 
 Tomi Mäkelä: "Jean Sibelius und seine Zeit" (German), Laaber-Verlag, Regensburg 2013

References

External links 
 

Compositions for symphony orchestra
Compositions by Jean Sibelius
1910 compositions